Alessia Doriana Padalino (born 26 April 1984) is a former Dutch-Italian field hockey player.

Personal life
Alessia Padalino was born in The Hague, Netherlands to a Dutch mother and Italian father. She has an identical twin sister, Chiara, who also plays hockey and was her teammate for Italy.

Career

Netherlands

Under–21
Padalino first represented the Netherlands Under–21 team in 2002, at the EuroHockey Junior Championship held in Alcalá la Real, Spain. She went on to represent the team again in 2004 at the next EuroHockey Junior tournament in Dublin, Ireland, winning gold medals at both events.

In 2005, Padalino won a bronze medal at the Junior World Cup, her last performance for the Dutch junior side.

Senior National Team
Following her success in the juniors, Padalino debuted for the senior national team in 2003. She never represented the side at a major tournament, rather a series of test matches in her four-year career with the team. During this time she achieved 14 caps and 1 goal.

Indoor
As well as field hockey, Padalino also represented the Netherlands in indoor hockey, most notably winning gold at the 2007 Indoor World Cup in Vienna, Austria.

Country Change
After representing the Netherlands for 5 years in junior and senior competition, Padalino made the switch to the Italian team in 2010. After not receiving a call-up to the Netherlands senior team for almost four year, Padalino received a call from Italian coaching staff asking her to represent the national team. She made her first appearance for Italy, her father's home country, in November 2010 in a test match against Argentina.

Italy

Senior National Team
Following her debut for Italy in 2010, Padalino maintained selection in the team until 2013, when she retired from international competition.

Padalino's most notable performance with the team was at the 2011 Champions Challenge II in Vienna where she won a silver medal, losing 2–1 to Belgium in the final. During the competition she scored 4 goals, including their only goal in the final.

Her final appearance for Italy was during the Hockey World League, at a Round 2 event in Valencia, Spain.

References

1984 births
Living people
Dutch female field hockey players
Italian female field hockey players